Milzano is a town and comune in the province of Brescia, in Lombardy. Surrounding comunes include Alfianello, Cigole, Pavone del Mella, Pralboino, San Gervasio Bresciano, Seniga.

References

Cities and towns in Lombardy